Prunus erythroxylon  (called palo prieto, or black stick) is a species of Prunus found in the montane cloud forests of Mexico. It has oblong to oval leaves that are less than 14cm long, small 8mm flowers and black fruit. It may be conspecific with Prunus brachybotrya.

References

erythroxylon 
Endemic flora of Mexico
Trees of Mexico
Plants described in 1915